Ardglass Castle (also known as The Newark) is situated in Ardglass, County Down, Northern Ireland. It was originally a row of 15th century warehouses by the harbour. Large sections of the original building can still be seen within the modern club house of Ardglass Golf Club. (Grid ref: 561 371)

History
The 15th century structures were converted into a castellated house at the end of the 18th century by Charles FitzGerald, the first and last Baron Lecale. The castle was also lived in by his mother, Emily FitzGerald, Duchess of Leinster, and her second husband, William Ogilvie, who had been tutor to her son, Lord Edward FitzGerald. Ogilvie subsequently worked to develop Ardglass as a fashionable seaside resort and port. The old warehouses were given battlements, regular windows and the interior was decorated with plasterwork of the period. It was eventually inherited by William Ogilvie's daughter by a former marriage, who was the wife of Charles Beauclerk, a great grandson of Charles Beauclerk, 1st Duke of St Albans. In the later 19th century there was further work on the windows and a porch added to one front. The castle became the premises of Ardglass Golf Club in 1911.

Features
The block of warehouses was built to provide 13 spaces behind the quay, guarded by towers at each end, and which it is assumed could be let out to resident or visiting merchants.

The Dublin Penny Journal of 30 March 1833 describes Ardglass Castle as follows:

See also 
Castles in Northern Ireland

References

External links
Royal Irish Academy - Three Medieval Buildings in the Port of Ardglass, Co. Down By T.E. McNeill, published 15 April 2005

Castles in County Down
Ardglass
Grade B1 listed buildings
Houses completed in the 15th century